Cerro Alto Peak is a mountain peak in San Luis Obispo County, California. It is 2,624 feet tall.

Recreation
There are a few routes to the summit. The quickest is a 1.95 mile class-one route. There is also an unpaved service/access road that leads mostly near to the summit as it goes to a nearby peak with communications antennas on it.

Mountain biking is common in the area and there are many trails on the mountain.

History
The name "Cerro Alto" means "high hill" in Spanish. 
The US Forest Service maintained a fire lookout tower on top of the peak until 1973.

The Cerro Alto summit gives you a view of all of the nine volcanic plugs in the region, called the Nine Sisters.

Campground
A campground is near the mountain of Cerro Alto.

References

Mountains of San Luis Obispo County, California
Mountains of Southern California